Being With You is a 1981 album by American singer Smokey Robinson. It is one of the few Smokey Robinson solo albums that have been released in the CD format. It features the million-selling, Gold-certified single title track "Being With You", which hit #1 on the Cash Box Top 100. It just missed the #1 Pop position in Billboard, peaking at #2, making it Robinson's highest-charting solo hit after leaving The Miracles.  It was also #1 for five consecutive weeks on the R&B Chart and for two weeks on the UK Singles Chart.

Smokey's first wife, fellow Miracles member Claudette Robinson, contributed background vocals to this album. This album has been Certified Gold by the RIAA. .  It eventually sold over 900,000 copies in the United States.

Track listing
All tracks composed by Smokey Robinson; except where indicated.
"Being With You" - 4:06
"Food For Thought" - 4:10
"If You Wanna Make Love (Come 'Round Here)" - 3:31
"Who's Sad" (Gary Goetzman, Mike Piccirillo) - 3:42
"Can't Fight Love" (Gary Goetzman, Mike Piccirillo) - 5:57
"You Are Forever" - 4:27
"As You Do" (Peter Kingsbery) - 3:13
"I Hear The Children Singing" (Forest Hairston) - 3:41

Charts

Personnel 
 Smokey Robinson – lead and backing vocals 
 Bill Cuomo – keyboards (1-6, 8)
 Mike Piccirillo – synthesizers (1-6, 8), organ (1-6, 8), guitar (1-6, 8), additional keyboards (2), percussion (2), steel drums (2)
 Reginald "Sonny" Burke – keyboards (7), arrangements (7)
 Ronnie Rancifer – keyboards (7)
 Paul Jackson Jr. – guitar  (7)
 Scott Edwards – bass (1-6, 8)
 Robert "Pops" Popwell – bass (7)
 Ed Greene – drums (1-6, 8)
 James Gadson – drums (7)
 Scotty Harris – drums (7)
 Howard Lee Wolen – percussion (1-6, 8)
 Mark Wolfson – percussion (1-6, 8)
 Joel Peskin – saxophones
 David Strout – trombone 
 Harry Kim – trumpet
 George Tobin – arrangements (1-6, 8)
 Ivory Davis – backing vocals 
 Patricia Henley – backing vocals 
 Robert John – backing vocals 
 Claudette Robinson – backing vocals
 Julia Waters Tillman – backing vocals
 Maxine Waters Willard – backing vocals

Production 
 Producers – George Tobin (Tracks 1-6 & 8); Smokey Robinson and Michael Lizzio (Track 7).
 Associate Producer – Mike Piccirillo for George Tobin Productions, Inc. (Tracks 1-6 & 8).
 Production Coordination – Lisa Marie  (Tracks 1-6 & 8)
 Project Managers – Randy Dunlap and Barbara Ramsey (Track 7)
 Engineers – Howard Lee Wolen and Mark Wolfson (Tracks 1-6 & 8); Michael Lizzio (Track 7).
 Assistant Engineers – Richie Griffin (Tracks 1-6 & 8); Ginny Pallante (Track 7).
 Mixing – George Tobin (Tracks 1-6 & 8); Michael Lizzio (Track 7).
 Mastering by John Lemay at Capitol Mastering (Hollywood, CA).
 Art Direction – Johnny Lee
 Design – Ginny Livingston
 Photography – Gary Heery
 Management – Gary Goetzman

References

Smokey Robinson albums
1981 albums
Motown albums